The 2019 Football Championship of Cherkasy Oblast was won by Altayir Drabiv.

League table

 Dnipro Cherkasy played in the 2019–20 Ukrainian Football Amateur League.

References

External links

Football
Cherkasy
Cherkasy